Koyo is an American punk rock band formed in 2020 in Stony Brook, New York. The band was formed as a supergroup of hardcore bands including SeeYouSpaceCowboy, with vocalist Joey Chiaramonte hailing from the band Typecaste. They released their debut EP Painting Words Into Lines in March 2020. In 2022, Koyo signed a record deal with Pure Noise Records.

The band's music has been compared to Long Island emo, pop punk and melodic hardcore bands such as Taking Back Sunday and The Movielife.

History  
Koyo formed in 2020 in Stony Brook, New York; the band describes themselves as playing "Stony Brook hardcore." Most of Koyo's members played in other hardcore bands such as SeeYouSpaceCowboy, Typecaste, Rain of Salvation, Hangman and Adrenaline. As all of the members were longtime friends before deciding to record music together, the ultimate goal was to "start more bands with the same core group of friends and see what sticks," according to vocalist Joey Chiaramonte, who is also the bassist of the band Typecaste. Another band, Soul Provider, also came out of this exercise.

Originally named The L Word after the song "Taming the L Word" by Long Island melodic hardcore band Silent Majority, guitarist Mike Marazzo suggested the name "Koyo", named after the Japanese term for the colors of leaves changing in autumn.

On March 14, 2020, the band released their debut EP Painting Words Into Lines. This was followed by the EP Drives Out East on July 6, 2021. The EP's lead single "Moriches", named after Moriches Road on Long Island, came out a week earlier along with a music video.

On March 7, 2022, Koyo signed to Pure Noise Records and released a new single, "Ten Digits Away".

Koyo toured in the Fall of 2021 with Anxious as a USA headliner. In the Spring of 2022, the band supported Knocked Loose. They have toured in support of Stick to Your Guns. They are supporting Silverstein in Europe in November of 2022. The band has also played a number of hardcore festivals all across the United States including LDB Fest, FYA Fest, Sound & Fury, and the Triple B Showcase, among others.

Influences 
Koyo has named Long Island emo and melodic hardcore bands as influences, including Brand New, Crime in Stereo, Glassjaw, Taking Back Sunday and The Movielife.

Band members 

 Joey Chiaramonte — lead vocals (2020–present)
 Mike Marazzo — guitar (2020–2022)
 TJ Rotolico — guitar (2020–present)
 Harold Griffin — guitar (2020–present)
 Stephen Spanos - bass (2020-present)
 Sal Argento — drums (2020–present)
 Anthony Maningsingh - lead granite respecter (2020-present)

References

External links 
Official band website

Supergroups (music)
American emo musical groups
Alternative rock groups from New York (state)